Danaideae is a tribe of flowering plants in the family Rubiaceae and contains 67 species in 3 genera. Its representatives are found in Tanzania and several islands in the western Indian Ocean: Comoros, Mauritius, Madagascar, and Réunion.

Genera
Currently accepted names
 Danais Comm. ex Vent. (37 spp)
 Payera Baill. (10 spp)
 Schismatoclada Baker (20 spp)

Synonyms
Alleizettea Dubard & Dop = Danais

References

Rubioideae tribes